Carl Peter Parelius Essendrop (6 June 1818 – 18 October 1893) was a Norwegian Lutheran  priest, educator  and Bishop of Oslo.

Biography
Essendrop was born Christiania (now Oslo), Norway. He was the son of Peter Essendrop (1776-1819) and Martha Marie Søborg (1784-1861). His brother was Bernhard Ludvig Essendrop. He became cand.theol. in 1839.

From 1842, he was a teaching  assistant at Trondheim Cathedral School. In 1849 he became  priest in Klæbu in Trøndelag.
Essendrop was the bishop of the Diocese of Tromsø from 1861 to 1867. From 1867 to 1872 he was the vicar of the Diocese of Kristiania, and also lectured at the Royal Frederick University. From 1 July 1872 to 23 November 1874 he was the Minister of Church and Education. He later filled in as acting Minister from 26 May to 4 June and 6 July to 20 July 1875. From 1875 to his death he was the Bishop of the Diocese of Kristiania.
 

During the term 1877–1879 he was a deputy member of the Norwegian Parliament, representing the constituency Kristiania, Hønefos og Kongsvinger. 

He was married to Karen Ursula Fabritius (1819-1889). Essendrop died at Kristiania and was buried at Vår Frelsers gravlund.

References

|-

1818 births
1893 deaths
Bishops of Oslo
University of Oslo alumni
Academic staff of the University of Oslo
19th-century Norwegian Lutheran clergy
Norwegian priest-politicians
Norwegian educators
Bishops of Hålogaland
19th-century Lutheran bishops
Government ministers of Norway
Deputy members of the Storting
Burials at the Cemetery of Our Saviour
Ministers of Education of Norway